Inspector Koo is a 2021 South Korean television series starring Lee Young-ae in the title role, alongside Kim Hye-jun, Kim Hae-sook, Kwak Sun-young, Baek Sung-chul and Cho Hyun-chul. The series is about the battle of a former police officer against a female college student who is a serial killer. It aired from October 30 to December 12, 2021 on JTBC's Saturdays and Sundays at 22:30 (KST) time slot. It is also available for streaming on Netflix in selected regions.

Synopsis
It follows the story of Koo Kyung-yi (Lee Young-ae), whose world is all about games and alcohol, as she digs into a mysterious serial murder case completely disguised as an accident.

Cast

Main
 Lee Young-ae as Koo Kyung-yi, an intelligent policewoman-turned-insurance investigator in her 40s who investigates a murder case.
 Kim Hye-jun as K / Song Yi-kyung (real name), a mysterious college student and a passionate amateur theater actress.
 Kim Hae-sook as Yong Sook (Director Yong), the director of a foundation.
 Kwak Sun-young as Na Je-hee, the head of NT Life Insurance's investigation team.
 Baek Sung-chul as Santa / Han Kwang-wook, Kyung-yi's assistant.
 Cho Hyun-chul as Oh Kyung-soo, an investigator at NT Life Insurance.

Supporting

People around K
 Lee Hong-nae as Geon-wook, K's supporter.
 Bae Hae-sun as Jung-yeon, K's aunt.

People around Director Yong
 Jung Seok-yong as Manager Kim
 Choi Dae-chul as Heo Sung-tae, Director Yong's eldest son.
 Park Ji-bin as Heo Hyun-tae, Director Yong's second son.

Extended
 Choi Young-joon as Jang Seong-woo, a high school theater teacher.

Special appearances
  as Kim Min-gyu
 Park Ye-young as Yoon Jae-young
  Park Kang-seop as Dae-ho
 Shin Yoon-seop as Park Gyu-il
 Kim Soo-ro as Gotham
 Ahn Shin-woo as Security team leader

Production
 Early working title of the series is Incredible Koo Kyung-yi.
 The first script reading of the cast was held in May 2021, and filming started the next month.

Viewership

Awards and nominations

Notes

References

External links
  
 
 
 

JTBC television dramas
Television series by KeyEast
Television series by JTBC Studios
South Korean action television series
South Korean thriller television series
South Korean comedy television series
2021 South Korean television series debuts
2021 South Korean television series endings
Korean-language Netflix exclusive international distribution programming